Antón is a district (distrito) of Coclé Province in Panama. The population according to the 2000 census was 44,039. The district covers a total area of 749 km². The capital lies at the city of Antón.

Administrative divisions
Antón District is divided administratively into the following corregimientos:

Antón (capital)
Cabuya
El Chirú
El Retiro
El Valle
Juan Díaz
Río Hato
San Juan de Dios ( corregimiento)
Santa Rita
Caballero

Economy 
Some of the district's primary economic activities include fishing, sugarcane production, and tourism.

See also
San Juan de Dios, Coclé community

References

Districts of Coclé Province